Hospital Nacional Psiquiátrico is a psychiatric hospital in San José, Costa Rica.

References

Hospitals in San José, Costa Rica
Psychiatric hospitals in Costa Rica